Mastodia is a genus of lichen-forming fungi in the family Verrucariaceae. It has six species. The genus was circumscribed in 1847 by Joseph Dalton Hooker and William Henry Harvey. The type species, Mastodia tessellata, is a bipolar (i.e., found in both the Arctic and Antarctica), coastal lichen. It forms a symbiotic association with the macroscopic genus Prasiola; this is the only known lichen symbiosis involving a foliose green alga. Studies suggest that throughout its geographic range, the lichen comprises two fungal species (the mycobionts) and three algal lineages (the photobionts) that associate.

Mastodia was once classified in the eponymously named, monogeneric family Mastodiaceae, proposed by Alexander Zahlbruckner in 1908. Over a century later, molecular phylogenetics analysis demonstrated that Mastodia tessellata belongs to the family Verrucariaceae, and has a sister taxon relationship with the marine genus Wahlenbergiella.

Species
Mastodia antarctica 
Mastodia borealis 
Mastodia georgica 
Mastodia mawsonii 
Mastodia mexicana 
Mastodia tessellata 

Both Mastodia complicatula , and Mastodia macquariensis  are synonyms of Mastodia tessellata.

References

Verrucariales
Eurotiomycetes genera
Lichen genera
Taxa described in 1847
Taxa named by Joseph Dalton Hooker
Taxa named by William Henry Harvey